The Klosterkammer Hannover (Hanover Monastic Chamber), based in Hanover, is a special authority within the scope of the Lower Saxony Ministry of Science and Culture. It administers former ecclesiastical, mediatized property and maintains churches and convents. In addition, as a foundation body, it administers four independent foundations under public law.

The Klosterkammer maintains and promotes church, social and educational projects. It is one of the oldest and most traditional state authorities in Lower Saxony, whose forerunner organisation was founded in the 16th century.

History 

The Klosterkammer Hannover was founded during the time of the sovereign church regiment, when state and church were still institutionally linked. It has its roots in the time of the Reformation in the Principality of Calenberg-Göttingen around 1542, when the regent Elisabeth von Calenberg ordered an inventory of the documents of the former Catholic convents, which had been converted to Protestant ladies' foundations during the Reformation. This was only carried out to a limited extent. After the reign of Elisabeth of Calenberg ended in 1545 due to the majority of her son Eric II, the reformation of the convents came to a halt, as Erich II had converted to the Catholic faith. It was only after his death in 1584, when the Principality of Calenberg-Göttingen fell to Braunschweig-Wolfenbüttel in inheritance, that under Duke Julius the monastic system was reorganised according to the Wolfenbüttel Church Constitution of 1569.

The Allgemeine Hannoversche Klosterfonds (General Hanoverian Monastery Fund), the predecessor organisation, experienced a significant increase in assets as a result of the Reichsdeputationshauptschluss 1803, when the clerical principalities of Hildesheim and Osnabrück fell to the Kingdom of Hanover in 1815. The assets of the dissolved convents were not confiscated by the state, but were transferred to the Klosterfonds. This increase in assets was the reason for the establishment of the Klosterkammer Hannover as the central authority. Prince Regent George IV set it up on 8 May 1818 to administer the former convent assets. During the time of the Prussian Province of Hanover from 1866 to 1945, the Klosterkammer, with its own President, was subordinate to the Chief President of the Province in Hanover.

Numerous former collegiate and convent churches in Lower Saxony are still owned by the Klosterkammer; they are used by Protestant and Catholic parishes as parish churches. In addition, there are extensive properties of the former convents. The president of the Klosterkammer is responsible for representing the respective prelatures at the Calenberg-Grubenhagen Landtag.

Administration and real estate 
The Klosterkammer is located in the Oststadt (East Town) of Hanover, not far from the Hochschule für Musik, Theater und Medien Hannover (Hanover University of Music, Theatre and Media). It administers the Allgemeine Hannoversche Klosterfonds (AHK), the Domstrukturfonds Verden (Verden Cathedral Structure Fund), the Stift Ilfeld (Ilfeld Abbey) and the Hospitalfonds St. Benedikti in Lüneburg (St. Benedict Hospital Fund in Lüneburg).

The Klosterkammer has an administrative, a real estate and a building department as well as the Klosterkammer forest business, which is managed by the convent forest offices in Soltau and Westerhof, as a state enterprise. There are about 135 employees who look after the extensive foundation assets. This consists mainly of around 40,000 hectares of land with agricultural and forest areas, gravel pits, nature conservation and leisure areas. Three quarters of the Klosterkammer is financed by almost 16,000 leasehold properties. In addition, the Chamber owns about 800 buildings, most of which are listed, including the Calenberg nunneries of Barsinghausen, Mariensee, Marienwerder, Wennigsen and Wülfinghausen. Also about 10,000 works of art belong to the possession.

Activity 

The administration of the four foundation assets by the Klosterkammer also includes the fulfilment of performance obligations towards numerous Protestant and Catholic parishes. In the vast majority of cases, these obligations have always been borne by the assets of the foundations, in particular the Allgemeine Hannoversche Klosterfonds (AHK). An initial list is found in Falk's memorandum of 1877, the size of which varies considerably. In the case of the parish of St. Michaelis Lüneburg, for example, the AHK is obliged to bear the entire costs of the parish, i.e. all personnel, material and building maintenance costs. In other cases, the AHK bears all or part of the parish pay and/or the construction maintenance of church buildings, rectories and cemetery chapels. In addition, the AHK provides subsidies for salaries and heating costs. Based on a contractual agreement of 1963/83 with the State of Lower Saxony, the AHK bears the performance obligation of the State of Lower Saxony towards the so-called Lüneburg abbeys, i.e. Damenstiften, Ebstorf, Isenhagen, Lüne, Medingen, Walsrode and Wienhausen. In return, the AHK was released from its obligation to pay benefits to the University of Göttingen and the excess claim was compensated by the transfer of agricultural and forestry assets. In addition, the Klosterkammer advises the convent foundations of Bassum, Börstel, Fischbeck and Obernkirchen in administrative, building and other specialist matters.

From the economic surpluses of the asset management, the Klosterkammer allocates subsidies of about three million euros annually for projects in Lower Saxony in accordance with the ecclesiastical, social and educational purpose of the foundation.

Managed abbeys and convents

Lüneburg abbeys 
Lüne Abbey
Ebstorf Abbey
Isenhagen Abbey
Medingen Abbey
Walsrode Abbey
Wienhausen Abbey

Calenberg abbeys 
Barsinghausen Abbey
Mariensee Abbey
Marienwerder Abbey
Wennigsen Abbey
Wülfinghausen Abbey

Feldklöster (Field abbeys) 
Grauhof Abbey
Riechenberg Abbey
St Peter and Paul (Heiningen)
Lamspringe Abbey
Wöltingerode Abbey

Other 
Minster Church of St. Alexandri (Einbeck)
Fischbeck Abbey
Obernkirchen Abbey
Börstel Abbey
Bassum Abbey
Ilfeld Abbey with the Ilfeld abbey school and more than 1,500 hectares of forest in the Nordhausen district of Thuringia
Bursfelde Abbey
Marienburg castle (Pattensen) (takeover was planned for 2019)

Directors and Presidents 
 Georg von der Wense (1818–1830), Geh. Kammerrat (Privy chamber councillor)
 Philipp von Lochhausen (1830–1851), Oberklosterrat (Superior convent councillor)
 Friedrich Hermann Albert von Wangenheim (1851–1861), Klosterkammerdirektor (Director of the Klosterkammer) 
 Heinrich Christian Georg Haccius (1862–1874), Klosterkammerdirektor
 Georg Wilhelm Niemeyer (1875–1877), Klosterkammerdirektor 
 Louis Sauerhering (1877–1889)
 Walther Herwig (1889–1901)
 Franz Rotzoll (1901–1921)
 Martin Richter (1921–1930)
 Albrecht Stalmann (1931–1955)
 Helmut Bojunga (1955–1958)
 Theodor Parisius (1959–1961)
 Hans Helmut zur Nedden (1961–1968)
 Herbert Weyher (1968–1970)
 Rolf Hauer (1970–1979)
 Axel Freiherr von Campenhausen (1979–1999)
 Martha Jansen (1999–2002)
 2003 vacancy
 Sigrid Maier-Knapp-Herbst (2004–2011)
 Hans-Christian Biallas (2011–2022)

References 

 Axel Freiherr von Campenhausen (ed.): Der Allgemeine Hannoversche Klosterfonds und die Klosterkammer Hannover. Schlüter, Hanover 1999, .
 Andreas Franitza: Der Allgemeine Hannoversche Klosterfonds und die Klosterkammer Hanover. Untersuchungen zur rechtsgeschichtlichen Entwicklung (= Schriften zum Staatskirchenrecht 2), Frankfurt am Main a.o. (2000).
 Klosterkammer Hannover (publisher): Klostergüter. Ein niedersächsisches Erbe. Hinstorff, Rostock 2011, .

External links 

 Klosterkammer Hannover
 Research platform: Sources on the history of the Klosterkammer Hannover
 Lecture by Sigrid Maier-Knapp-Herbst about Elisabeth of Brandenburg and the development of the Klosterkammer (PDF file; 58 kB)

Organisations based in Lower Saxony
Foundations based in Germany
Government agencies of Germany
!Klosterkammer Hannover
Kingdom of Hanover
Government agencies established in 1818